Kampong Ties is a Malaysian-Singaporean television drama series (co-production). It is also the third production by MediaCorp Studios Malaysia Sdn Bhd. It was telecast from every Monday to Thursday, at 10:00pm on Malaysia's ntv7, starting 27 September and ended on 16 November 2011. It stars Ann Kok, Yvonne Lim , Zheng Geping , Shaun Chen & Ng Hui as casts in this series. In Singapore, the series made its debut on 24 October at 7:00pm and had ended its run on 2 December 2011. The series was repeated at 4am on Sundays.

Some episodes in Singapore were also rated PG for some violent scenes. All episodes are available on Tonton (Malaysia) and xinmsn (Singapore).

Plot

Set against a backdrop of magnificent lush greenery in a secluded part of Sungai Lembing in Kuantan, Pahang. Shuixian (Yvonne Lim) was forced by her foster mother to marry Lihai (Shaun Chen), whom later died in an accident, leaving Shuixian a young widow. Yueman (Ann Kok) is married to Jiaqing (Zhang Wenxiang), an abusive man. One day, Shuixian accidentally kills Jiaqing but was saved by Yueman who claimed Jiaqing was killed by his debtors. Both of them leave the village and met Youbao (Zheng Geping), head of a secret society.

Cast

Cai Family

Wang Family

Other cast

Trivia 
This drama was not originally planned to be a co-production with ntv7.
This drama is also the first Singaporean production after long-running Taiwanese drama Love, which had been airing on local screens since Year 2008.
Zeng Youbao's nickname is "Buaya". Buaya means crocodile in Malay, and thus he can be seen wearing shoes made of crocodile skin leather.
Shaun Chen & Yvonne Lim second collaboration after Your Hand In Mine 
Despite the namesake though, Kampong Ties did not show any Malays or Indians acting in the drama. The characters in this drama are also not as caring and harmonious as the Singaporean viewers thought. Some episodes in Singapore are rated PG for some violent scenes.

Awards & Nominations
The series was nominated for 6 awards, Best Actor, Best Supporting Actress , Favourite Female Character , Best Theme Song, Best Director  & Best Screenplay .

Star Awards 2012

See also
List of Kampong Ties episodes

References

External links
Opening theme
Singapore official website at xinmsn

Chinese-language drama television series in Malaysia
2011 Malaysian television series debuts
2011 Malaysian television series endings
2011 Singaporean television series debuts
2011 Singaporean television series endings
NTV7 original programming
Channel 8 (Singapore) original programming